Lake Pomacocha (possibly from Quechua puma cougar, puma, qucha lake) is a lake in Peru located in the Pasco Region, Pasco Province, Simón Bolívar District.

References

Lakes of Peru
Lakes of Pasco Region